Chinnamanna Narayanaswamy Naidu was a former president of the All India Farmers' Association & Tamil Nadu Agriculturists' Association and a farmers' leader. A memorial was constructed at Vaiyampalayam in Coimbatore district, on the memory of Naidu.

On Dec 2020, Tamil Nadu government announced that an award will be given to farmers for obtaining highest yield of paddy through the System of Rice Intensification method during the Republic Day celebrations every year will be named after farmers’ leader late C Narayanasamy Naidu, who strove for the rights of the farmers for many decades.

References

People from Coimbatore district
People from Tamil Nadu